Zaamin or Zomin may refer to:
Zaamin National Park, a nature preserve in Uzbekistan
Zomin District, a district in Jizzakh Region in Uzbekistan 
Zomin, a town in Uzbekistan that serves as the county seat for the Zomin District
FK Zaamin, an association football club based in the town